Liberal International (LI) is a worldwide organization of liberal political parties. The political international was founded in Oxford in 1947 and has become the pre-eminent network for liberal parties aiming to strengthen liberalism around the world. Its headquarters are at 1 Whitehall Place, London, SW1A 2HD, within the National Liberal Club. The Oxford Manifesto describes the basic political principles of the Liberal International, which is currently made up of 111 parties and organizations.

Aims 
The Liberal International Constitution (2005) gives its purposes as:  The principles that unite member parties from Africa, America, Asia and Europe are respect for human rights, free and fair elections and multi-party democracy, social justice, tolerance, market economy, free trade, environmental sustainability and a strong sense of international solidarity.

The aims of Liberal International are also set out in a series of seven manifestos, written between 1946 and 1997, and are furthered by a variety of bodies including a near-yearly conference for liberal parties and individuals from around the world.

Bureau 
The bureau of Liberal International is elected every 18 months by the delegates of the congress.

The 14th president of Liberal International is Hakima el Haite of the Mouvement Populaire (Morocco), is a former Minister of Environment, UN climate champion, and climate scientist. Madam El Haite succeeded Dr Juli Minoves, formerly Andorra's foreign minister and representative to the United Nations.

Former Presidents include Hans Van Baalen MEP, John, Lord Alderdice, Dutch politician and former European Commissioner Frits Bolkestein, German politician Otto Graf Lambsdorff, and Spain's first democratically elected prime minister after Francoist Spain, Adolfo Suárez.

The secretary-general of Liberal International is Gordon Mackay, a former Member of the National Assembly of South Africa. Other members of the bureau include Deputy President Prof. Karl-Heinz Paque; and Vice Presidents Cellou Dalein Diallo (Guinea), Kitty Monterrey (Nicaragua), Abir al-Sahlani (Sweden), Kiat Sittheamorn (Thailand) and Robert Woodthorpe Browne (United Kingdom). There are two elected treasurers, Judith Pallares MP (Andorra) and Minister Omar Youm (Senegal).

Awards 
Liberal International awards prizes to individuals in the areas of human rights and liberalism.

Prize for Freedom:

The Liberal International Prize for Freedom is LI's most prestigious human rights award. Conveyed annually since 1984 to an individual of liberal conviction who has made outstanding efforts for the defence of freedom and human rights, recipients include Maria Corina Machado of Venezuela, Senator Leila de Lima of the Philippines, Raif Badawi of Saudi Arabia, Waris Dirie of Somalia and Vaclav Havel of Czechoslovakia and the Czech Republic.

Medal of Liberalism:

The Liberal International Medal of Liberalism is awarded to individuals who have worked to advance liberal values on a local, national and international level. Recipients include President Alassane Ouattara of Ivory Coast, Prime Minister Xavier Bettel of Luxembourg, President Tsai Ing-wen of Taiwan and Alliance of Liberals and Democrats for Europe leader Sir Graham Watson of the United Kingdom.

Publications 
The LI Human Rights Bulletin is published three times per year and consists of opinion articles, video interviews and digest of the work of the LI human rights committee.

Thematic publications are published online and in print on an ad hoc basis. Recent texts have offered a liberal perspective on issues ranging from freedom of belief to the responsibility to protect.
ʒ

Oxford Manifesto 
The Oxford Manifesto, drawn up in April 1947 at Wadham College in Oxford by representatives from 19 liberal political parties from South Africa, Germany, Austria, Belgium, Canada, Cyprus, Spain, Estonia, United Kingdom, United States, Finland, France, Hungary, Italy, Norway, Sweden, Switzerland, Czechoslovakia and Turkey is a document describing the basic political principles of the Liberal International. Creation of its main principles were led by Salvador de Madariaga.

The Oxford Manifesto was inspired by the ideas of William Beveridge and is regarded as one of the defining political documents of the 20 century.

Fifty years on, in 1997, Liberal International returned to Oxford and issued a supplement to the original manifesto, The Liberal Agenda for the 21st century, describing Liberal policies in greater detail. The second Oxford Manifesto was adopted by the 48th Congress of Liberal International, which was held on 27–30 November 1997 in the Oxford Town Hall. In 2017, the global federation marked its 70th anniversary with the adoption of the Andorra Liberal Manifesto for the twenty-first century (ALM). A three-year project across numerous continents initiated by then president Juli Minoves, the ALM embodied the widest consultation of views undertaken by Liberal International in order to compile a policy document.

Organisation

Presidents

Members

Incumbent heads of state and government

Full members 
LI has 90 political parties.

Observer parties

Individual member

Cooperating organizations 
Cooperating and regional organisations are groups with a recognised status in the constitution of Liberal International as bodies that share the values and objectives of LI but do not operate as a political party. Co-operating organisations have the right of representation but in no case the right to vote at statutory events. LI has 12 cooperating organizations.

Liberal think tanks and foundations
The International is also in a loose association with the following 10 organisations:

See also 
Liberalism by country
Prize For Freedom
Alliance of Democrats (defunct)
European Democratic Party

References

External links
Liberal International official site
The Liberal Agenda for the 21st century 
Former LI Vice President Bi-khim Hsiao 

 
International conferences
 
Political internationals
Political organisations based in London
Organizations established in 1947
1947 establishments in England